The Tindal Centre (formerly Tindal Hospital) was a centre for the treatment of mental disorders in Aylesbury, Buckinghamshire, England. It was managed by Oxford Health NHS Foundation Trust.

History
The facility had its origins in a workhouse infirmary built for the Aylesbury Poor Law Union Workhouse at Bierton Hill and completed in the late 19th century. The workhouse became Tindal Hospital during the Second World War and, more recently, the main block became home to a mental health facility known as the Tindal Centre. After services had transferred to the Whiteleaf Centre in Aylesbury, the Tindal Centre closed in 2014.

References

External links 
 Oxford Health NHS Foundation Trust

Residential buildings completed in 1844
Aylesbury
Former psychiatric hospitals in England
Hospitals in Buckinghamshire
Defunct hospitals in England